Hari Shankar Mishra is a current Governor of Madhesh Province. He was appointed Governor, as per the Article 163 (2)  of the Constitution of Nepal by the President Bidya Devi Bhandari on the recommendation of the Council of Ministers of the Government of Nepal on 17 August 2021. He is a former member of House of representatives.

Political life 
Before being appointed Governor, he was member of the Nepali Congress party. He was elected to the House of representatives from Mahottari-2 in the 1991 Nepalese general election with a margin of 4,000 votes.

Personal life 
Mishra's father, Ram Narayan Mishra, was one of the founders of the Nepali Congress, and served as Minister for Industry and Commerce in the B.P. Koirala cabinet which was elected in 1959 as the first elected government of Nepal. Mishra's uncle, Bhadrakali Mishra, was also a politician, who was a government minister in the 1950s.

Electoral history

1991 legislative elections

References

External links

Governors of Madhesh Province
Nepali Congress politicians from Madhesh Province
Year of birth missing (living people)
Living people
Nepal MPs 1991–1994